Concordia Academy may refer to:

 Concordia Academy (Minnesota)
 Concordia Academy (Austin, Texas)
 Concordia Academy (Moncton, New Brunswick)